Henry Adam Procter (1883 – 26 March 1955) was a British Conservative Party politician.

Born in West Derby, Liverpool, he was educated at Bethany College, in the United States, the University of Melbourne and the University of Edinburgh. During the First World War he served in the army from 1916 onwards. In 1920 he was commissioned into the Army Educational Corps as a captain; he retired in 1922 with the rank of major. He was called to the bar at the Middle Temple in 1931

Procter was elected the member of parliament (MP) for the Accrington constituency in the 1931 general election, and was re-elected in 1935. He was defeated at the 1945 general election.

He married Amy Bedford, and had three daughters. He died in Paddington aged 71.

Notes

References
 "PROCTER, Henry Adam". In Who Was Who 1897-2006

External links 
 

1883 births
1955 deaths
Alumni of the University of Edinburgh
Bethany College (West Virginia) alumni
British Army personnel of World War I
Conservative Party (UK) MPs for English constituencies
Politics of Hyndburn
Royal Army Educational Corps officers
UK MPs 1931–1935
UK MPs 1935–1945
University of Melbourne alumni
Military personnel from Liverpool